Georgina Anderson (22 October 1998 – 14 November 2013) was a singer from Marske-by-the-Sea, Teesside. On 14 November 2013 she died after being diagnosed with stage four liver cancer. Her posthumous 2013 single, "Two-Thirds of a Piece" reached number 63 on the UK Singles Chart.

Music career
In April 2013, Anderson uploaded a cover version of Bonnie Raitt's "I Can't Make You Love Me" to YouTube.  The video accumulated over 300,000 views. In early November, Anderson's second YouTube song—"Two-Thirds of a Piece"—was played to 14,000 fans at Middlesbrough F.C. with Anderson in attendance. "Two-Thirds of a Piece" was released posthumously on 15 November, and had peaked at number 63 on the UK Singles Chart.

Death
Anderson died at age 15 after being diagnosed with stage four liver cancer, having failed all available treatment options for her condition.

Discography

Singles

References

2013 deaths
1998 births
English child singers
21st-century English women singers
21st-century English singers
Deaths from liver cancer
Deaths from cancer in England
Place of death missing